Dorstenia hirta is an herbaceous plant species in the family Moraceae which is native to eastern Brazil.

References

hirta
Plants described in 1826
Flora of Brazil